The following lists events that happened during 1820 in Australia.

Incumbents
Monarch – George III until 29 January 1820 then George IV

Governors
Governors of the Australian colonies:
Governor of New South Wales- Major-General Lachlan Macquarie
Lieutenant-Governor of Tasmania – Colonel William Sorell

Events
 3 May – John Joseph Therry and Philip Conolly, the first Catholic priests officially appointed to Australia, arrive at Port Jackson from Ireland.
 19 August – Joseph Wild discovers Lake George and names the Snowy Mountains.
 28 October – Governor Macquarie names Lake George after King George III.
 1 December – Campbelltown, New South Wales is established.
 Sydney has 1,084 buildings – mostly single-storey dwellings – and 12,079 people.
 Sheep population in Australia - 120,000.

Births
 14 May – James Martin (died 1886), Premier of New South Wales

References

 
Australia
Years of the 19th century in Australia